Elgin Museum is a museum of local history in Elgin, Moray, Scotland. Its collections cover area fossils and geology, archaeology, ethnography, art and local history. Opened in 1843, it is one of the oldest independent museums in the country. The museum is run by The Moray Society. Entry to the museum is free.

The museum is housed in a Category A listed building on Elgin's High Street and was designed by architect Thomas Mackenzie in 1842, with later alterations and additions made by A. Marshall Mackenzie and Son in 1920.

Its fossil collection is classed as a Recognised Collection by Museums Galleries Scotland. In August 2021, the bones of a 375 million year old predator discovered three miles away were put on display.

References

External links
 Elgin Museum

Museums in Moray
1843 establishments in Scotland
Elgin, Moray
Museums established in 1843
Local museums in Scotland
Category A listed buildings in Moray
Listed museum buildings in Scotland